Weston under Penyard is a small village in Herefordshire, England. The population of the civil parish at the 2011 Census was 1,007.

It lies on the A40 road two miles east of Ross-on-Wye. The Penyard is a prominent hill.

The parish church of St Lawrence has a tall 14th-century west tower which had a spire until it was damaged by lightning in 1750.

A Wesleyan chapel was constructed at Buryhill during the early 19th century but was disused by 1964. The building was subsequently converted for use as private residence.

Slightly to the east under farmland lies the former Roman settlement of Ariconium, which gave its name to the historical Welsh Kingdom spanning areas of what is now known as Herefordshire Ergyng and Archenfield. The name Ariconium is Romano-British and may conceivably have an equivalent in or near the Roman province of Galatia.

Herefordshire escaped most of the battles with the Vikings but in 914 the Danes made additional visits to the area and ravaged Archenfield, according to the Anglo-Saxon Chronicle (AD 915, Worcester Manuscript, p. 99). The jarls leading the raids, Ohtor and Hroald, captured Bishop Cameleac or Cyfeiliog, then the Bishop of Llandaff; he was later ransomed. The jarls were killed in a subsequent battle at "Kill Dane Field" in Weston-under-Penyard and the raiders were subdued.

The Bristol merchant Richard Amerike (c. 1445–1503) who, it is claimed, gave his name to America, was born here.

On the edge of the village is Bollitree Castle, which is currently owned by The Grand Tour, and former Top Gear, presenter Richard Hammond. It comprises a house built circa 1700 incorporating  the remains of an earlier building, to which castellated walls, turrets and moat were added in the late eighteenth century.  Two miles south west are the fragmentary remains of Penyard Castle, a fourteenth-century castle on the site of which was built a seventeenth-century house. Penyard House is a Georgian building which now operates as a hotel.

Railways
Weston under Penyard Halt was a former station on the Hereford, Ross and Gloucester Railway on the section between  Ross-on-Wye and Grange Court and thence to Gloucester.  Opened in 1929 to compete with local road transport it was located on the Great Western Railway line linking Ross-on-Wye and Gloucester. Nothing remains of the station.

References

External links 

Herefordshire County Council page
No longer extant reference - Weston under Penyard on the Wyenot website
Weston under Penyard at Vision of Britain
Old photos of Weston under Penyard

Villages in Herefordshire
Folly castles in England